Wang Yih-jiun (born 17 May 1927) is a Taiwanese former basketball player. He competed as part of the Republic of China's squad at the 1956 Summer Olympics.

References

External links
 

1927 births
Possibly living people
Taiwanese men's basketball players
Olympic basketball players of Taiwan
Basketball players at the 1956 Summer Olympics
Asian Games medalists in basketball
Basketball players at the 1954 Asian Games
Basketball players at the 1958 Asian Games
Asian Games silver medalists for Chinese Taipei
Medalists at the 1954 Asian Games
Medalists at the 1958 Asian Games
1954 FIBA World Championship players
Republic of China men's national basketball team players